Nail-tail wallaby refers to Onychogalea, a genus describing three species of macropods, all of which are found in Australia. Related to kangaroos and wallabies, they are smaller sized species distinguished by a horny spur at the end of their tail. The northern nail-tail wallaby is still common in the northern part of Australia, the crescent nail-tail is now extinct, and the bridled nail-tail is considered rare and endangered, with probably fewer than 1100 mature individuals in the wild. Nail-tail wallabies are smaller than many other wallabies.

Taxonomy
There are three recognised species  of the genus Onychogalea, the nail-tailed wallabies, they are:

 Onychogalea fraenata, the bridled nailtail, whose range and population has greatly declined since colonisation;
 Onychogalea lunata, the crescent nailtail, warong, once abundant and widespread across the southwest and centre, the smallest species entered a rapid decline and became extinct;
 Onychogalea unguifera the northern species, still extant in the Kimberley and Top End regions.

Description
A genus of Macropodidae, small and herbivorous species with a shy disposition. The earliest descriptions noted their elegant shape, graceful movements and beautiful markings. Named for one of their general characteristics, the nail-tailed wallaby has a horny point two or three millimetres wide at the tip of the tail, an almost unknown characteristic for a mammal that has been compared to the bony spur of a lion's tail.

References

External links

 

Macropods
Marsupials of Australia
Taxa named by John Edward Gray